Humphrey William Bouverie Carpenter (29 April 1946 – 4 January 2005) was an English biographer, writer, and radio broadcaster. He is known especially for his biographies of J. R. R. Tolkien and other members of the literary society the Inklings.

Early life
Carpenter was born (and lived almost all of his life, and died) in the city of Oxford. His father was Harry Carpenter, Bishop of Oxford. His mother was Urith Monica Trevelyan, who had training in the Fröbel teaching method. As a child, he lived in the Warden's Lodgings at Keble College, Oxford, where his father served as warden until his appointment as Bishop of Oxford. He was educated at the Dragon School Oxford, and Marlborough College and then read English at Keble.

Non-fiction works
His biographies included J. R. R. Tolkien: A Biography (1977; also editing of The Letters of J. R. R. Tolkien), The Inklings: CS Lewis, JRR Tolkien, Charles Williams and their Friends (1978; winner of the 1978 Somerset Maugham Award), W. H. Auden (1981), Ezra Pound (1988; winner of the Duff Cooper Memorial Prize), Evelyn Waugh (1989), Benjamin Britten (1992), Robert Runcie (1997), Dennis Potter, and Spike Milligan (2004). He also authored Geniuses Together: American Writers in Paris in the 1920s (1987), and his last book The Seven Lives of John Murray (2008) about John Murray and the publishing house of Albemarle Street, was published posthumously.

He also wrote histories of BBC Radio 3 (on which he had regular stints as broadcaster), the British satire boom of the 1960s, Angry Young Men: A Literary Comedy of the 1950s (2002), and a centennial history of the Oxford University Dramatic Society in 1985. His encyclopaedic work, The Oxford Companion to Children's Literature (1984), written jointly with his wife, Mari Prichard, has become a standard reference source.

Children's books
His Mr Majeika series of children's books were adapted for television. The Joshers: Or London to Birmingham with Albert and Victoria (1977) is a children's adventure book, similar in style to The Railway Children and based on the adventure of taking a working narrowboat up the Grand Union Canal from London to Birmingham.

Broadcasting
Carpenter began his broadcasting career at BBC Radio Oxford as a presenter and producer where he met Prichard (whose father was Caradog Prichard, the Welsh novelist and poet); they married in 1973. They jointly produced A Thames Companion in 1975. He played a role in launching Radio 3's  arts discussion programme Night Waves and acted as a regular presenter of other programmes on the network including Radio 3's afternoon drivetime programme In Tune and, until it was discontinued, its Sunday request programme Listeners' Choice. Until his death, he presented the BBC Radio 4 biography series Great Lives recorded in Bristol. The last edition recorded before his death featured an interview with the singer Eddi Reader about the poet Robert Burns, the major focus of her creative work. BBC Radio 4 broadcast this programme on New Year's Eve, 2004.

Jazz music and children's drama
Carpenter was an amateur jazz musician who played the piano, the saxophone, and the double-bass, the last instrument professionally in a dance band in the 1970s. In 1983, he formed a 1930s style jazz band, Vile Bodies, which for many years enjoyed a residency at the Ritz Hotel in London. He also founded the Mushy Pea Theatre Group, a children's drama group based in Oxford, which premiered his Mr Majeika: The Musical in 1991 and Babes, a musical about Hollywood child stars.

Death
Humphrey Carpenter died in 2005 of heart failure, compounded by the Parkinson's disease from which he had suffered for several years. He was buried in Wolvercote Cemetery in Oxford, also the final resting place of J. R. R. Tolkien. A commemorative stained glass window was installed in St Margaret's Institute, Polstead Road, honouring Carpenter's many accomplishments.

References

External links
 A perceptive biographer and engaging broadcaster, The Guardian, 5 January 2005
 Gently mischievous broadcaster and prolific writer, The Times, 6 January 2005
 Humphrey Carpenter, English biographer, dies at 58, New York Times, 19 January 2005
 Tributes Paid to Humphrey Carpenter BBC Radio
 
 Finding aid to the Humphrey Carpenter papers at Columbia University Rare Book & Manuscript Library

1946 births
2005 deaths
Burials at Wolvercote Cemetery
Alumni of Keble College, Oxford
BBC Radio 3 presenters
BBC Radio 4 presenters
Children's literature criticism
English biographers
People with Parkinson's disease
English children's writers
English jazz pianists
English jazz saxophonists
British jazz double-bassists
English non-fiction writers
People educated at Marlborough College
People educated at The Dragon School
20th-century biographers
English male novelists
20th-century English male writers
Male biographers
20th-century saxophonists
Britten scholars